Jerry Glacier is in Wenatchee National Forest in the U.S. state of Washington, on the north slope of Crater Mountain.

See also
List of glaciers in the United States

References

Glaciers of the North Cascades
Glaciers of Whatcom County, Washington
Glaciers of Washington (state)